The Masonic Lodge No. 472 is an Italianate building in Zaleski, Ohio that was built in 1884.  It was listed on the National Register of Historic Places in 2000.  Currently, no Masonic lodges meet in the building and there is no lodge with the number 472 active in Ohio.

References

External links
National Register nomination form

Clubhouses on the National Register of Historic Places in Ohio
Buildings and structures in Vinton County, Ohio
National Register of Historic Places in Vinton County, Ohio
Masonic buildings completed in 1884
Houses completed in 1884
Former Masonic buildings in Ohio